.cw is the Internet country code top-level domain (ccTLD) for Curaçao. It was created following the decision on December 15, 2010 by the ISO 3166 Maintenance Agency to allocate CW as the ISO 3166-1 alpha-2 code for Curaçao. This decision followed Curaçao's new status as an autonomous country within the Kingdom of the Netherlands on October 10, 2010. The University of Curaçao, which already was the sponsor for .an was designated as the sponsoring organization. Registration of .cw domains was available from 1 February 2012.

Previously, many websites in Curaçao used the former Netherlands Antilles's ccTLD, .an. Domains from .an were able to switch to .sx (Sint Maarten) or .cw, depending on where they are based.

See also
Internet in the Netherlands
.nl
.sx

References

External links
 IANA .cw whois information

Country code top-level domains
Communications in Curaçao